The 1992 Detroit Lions season was the 63rd season in franchise history. After going 12–4 from the 1991 season, the Lions took a step back as they posted a disappointing 5-11 record despite another Pro Bowl season from Barry Sanders, who passed Billy Sims for the franchise record in rushing on November 22. The Lions were expected to once again challenge for the NFC title. However, that did not happen, as they failed to qualify for the playoffs. It would be the first season the franchise would have involving kicker Jason Hanson. He would play 21 seasons as a Lion, a franchise record.

Offseason

NFL Draft 

Notes

 Detroit traded up from its third-round selection (82nd) with Dallas for the Cowboys' second-round selection (56th), giving up its fourth- and ninth-round selections (190th and 250th) in return.
 Detroit received Denver's third-round selection (81st) in return for OT Harvey Salem.
 Detroit's fifth-round pick (138th) was traded to New Orleans in exchange for WR Brett Perriman.
 Detroit traded up from its sixth-round selection (165th) with New England for the Patriots' sixth-round selection (145th), giving up its seventh-, tenth- and twelfth-round selections (194th, 277th and 333rd) in return.

Personnel

Staff

Roster

Regular season

Schedule

Game summaries

Week 16 

    
    
    
    
    

 Barry Sanders 20 Rush, 113 Yds

Standings

References

External links 
 1992 Detroit Lions at Pro-Football-Reference.com

Detroit Lions
Detroit Lions seasons
Detroit Lions